Orichalcum or aurichalcum  is a metal mentioned in several ancient writings, including the story of Atlantis in the Critias of Plato. Within the dialogue, Critias (460–403 BC) claims that orichalcum had been considered second only to gold in value and had been found and mined in many parts of Atlantis in ancient times, but that by Critias's own time, orichalcum was known only by name.

Orichalcum may have been a noble metal such as platinum, as it was supposed to be mined, or one type of bronze or brass or possibly some other metal alloy.

Overview 

The Romans transliterated "orichalcum" as "aurichalcum", which was thought to mean literally "gold copper". It is known from the writings of Cicero that the metal which they called orichalcum resembled gold in color but had a much lower value. In Virgil's Aeneid, the breastplate of Turnus is described as "stiff with gold and white orichalc".

Orichalcum has been held to be either a gold–copper alloy, a copper–tin or copper–zinc brass, or a metal or metallic alloy no longer known.

In later years, "orichalcum" was used to describe the sulfide mineral chalcopyrite and also to describe brass. However, these usages are difficult to reconcile with the claims of Plato's Critias, who states that the metal was "only a name" by his time, while brass and chalcopyrite were very important in the time of Plato, as they still are today.

Joseph Needham notes that Bishop Richard Watson, an eighteenth-century professor of chemistry, wrote of an ancient idea that there were "two sorts of brass or orichalcum". Needham also suggests that the Greeks may not have known how orichalcum was made and that they might even have had an imitation of the original.

In 2015, 39 ingots believed to be orichalcum were discovered in a sunken vessel on the coasts of Gela in Sicily which have tentatively been dated at 2,600 years old. They were analyzed with X-ray fluorescence by Dario Panetta of Technologies for Quality and turned out to be an alloy consisting of 75–80% copper, 15–20% zinc, and smaller percentages of nickel, lead, and iron. Another cache of 47 ingots were recovered in February 2016 and found to have similar composition as measured with ICP-OES and ICP-MS: around 65–80% copper, 15–25% zinc, 4-7% lead, 0.5-1% nickel, and trace amounts of Ni, Ag, Sb, As, Bi and other elements.

Ancient literature 
Orichalcum is first mentioned in the 7th century BC by Hesiod, and in the Homeric hymn dedicated to Aphrodite, dated to the 630s.

According to the Critias of Plato, the inner wall surrounding the citadel of Atlantis with the Temple of Poseidon "flashed with the red light of orichalcum". The interior walls, pillars, and floors of the temple were completely covered in orichalcum, and the roof was variegated with gold, silver, and orichalcum. In the center of the temple stood a pillar of orichalcum, on which the laws of Poseidon and records of the first son princes of Poseidon were inscribed.

Pliny the Elder points out that orichalcum had lost currency due to the mines being exhausted. Pseudo-Aristotle in De mirabilibus auscultationibus (62) describes a type of copper that is "very shiny and white, not because there is tin mixed with it, but because some earth is combined and molten with it." This might be a reference to orichalcum obtained during the smelting of copper with the addition of "cadmia", a kind of earth formerly found on the shores of the Black Sea, which is attributed to be zinc oxide.

Numismatics 
In numismatics, the term "orichalcum" is used to refer to the golden-colored bronze alloy used for the sestertius and dupondius coins. It is considered more valuable than copper, of which the as coin was made.

See also 

 Ashtadhatu
 Auricupride
 Corinthian bronze
 Electrum
 Hepatizon
 Panchaloha
 Shakudō
 Shibuichi
 Thokcha
 Tumbaga

References

External links 
 

Atlantis
Coins of ancient Rome
Precious metal alloys
Mythological substances
Ancient Greek metalwork

el:Ορείχαλκος